This is a list of individual musical artists originating from Spain. For groups and bands, see List of bands from Spain. See also Music of Spain.

A

 Agoney
 Aid
 Ainhoa
 Aitana
 Alaska
Pablo Alborán
 Edith Alonso
 Eva Amaral
 Remedios Amaya
 Ana Belén
 Soraya Arnelas
Santiago Auserón
 Luis Eduardo Aute

B
 
 Barei
 Bebe
 Paloma Berganza
 Teresa Berganza
 Carlos Berlanga
 Beth
 David Bisbal
 Miguel Bosé
 David Bustamante
 Braulio
 Concha Buika
 Enrique Bunbury

C
 Montserrat Caballé
 Kaydy Cain
 Juan Carlos Calderón
 Camarón de la Isla
 José María Cano
 Nacho Cano
 Blas Cantó
 Nacho Canut
 Manolo Caracol
 Antonio Carbonell
 Antonio Carmona
 Manuel Carrasco
 Alex Cartañá
 José Carreras
 Luz Casal
 Pablo Casals
 Cecilia
 Rosa Cedrón
 Paco Cepero
 Chenoa
 Chiquetete
El Chojin
Diego el Cigala
David Civera
Anabel Conde
 Conchita
 Javier Corcobado
 Cristie

D

 Sergio Dalma
 Deluxe
 David DeMaria
 Dan Medina Gravity
 Daniel Diges
 Plácido Domingo
 Rocío Dúrcal
 Dareysteel
 Shaila Dúrcal
 Dyango

E
 Edurne
 Mikel Erentxun

F
 El Fary
 Nuria Fergó
 Iván Ferreiro
 Mercedes Ferrer
 Antonio Flores
 Lola Flores
 Lolita Flores
 Rosario Flores
 Silverio Franconetti
 Rafael Frühbeck de Burgos

G
Elena Gadel
José Galisteo
Manolo García
Luis Antonio García Navarro
Jorge González
Quique González
Ana Guerra
Pedro Guerra

H
 Pablo Heras-Casado
 Hevia

I

 Paco Ibáñez
 Idaira
 Enrique Iglesias
 Julio Iglesias
 Julio Iglesias Jr.
 Lola Índigo
Julián Infante
Camarón de la Isla
 José Iturbi
 Pedro Iturralde

J
 Jeanette
 María Jiménez
 Natalia Jiménez
 Rocío Jurado

K
 Karina
 Alfredo Kraus
 Patricia Kraus

L
Ana Laan
José Antonio Labordeta
Natalia Lacunza
Vicky Larraz
 Alicia de Larrocha
 El Lebrijano 
 Lluis Llach
 Marcos Llunas
 Loquillo
 Rosa López
 Jesús López-Cobos
 Lorena
 Ruth Lorenzo
 Paco de Lucía
 Pepe de Lucía
 Beatriz Luengo

M
 Virginia Maestro
 Juan Magán
 Malú
La Mari
Mari Trini
 Marisol
 Vanesa Martín
 India Martínez
Leire Martínez
 Massiel
 Melendi
Raquel Meller
Mai Meneses
 Merche
 Antonio Molina
 Amaia Montero
 María José Moreno (born 1967), light lyric soprano
 Leticia Moreno
 Enrique Morente
 Jaime Morey

N
 Nach 
 Mónica Naranjo
 Nina
 Najwa Nimri
 Sak Noel

O
 Aitana Ocaña Morales
Antonio Orozco

P
 Isabel Pantoja
 Niña Pastori
 José Luis Perales
Peret
 el Porta 
 María Dolores Pradera

R
 Amalia Ramírez
 Ramón
 Olga Ramos (1918–2005), singer, violinist, and actress
 Raphael
 Alba Reche
 Rels B
 Miguel Ríos
Mala Rodríguez
Josep Roig Boada
 Danny Romero
 Verónica Romero
 Rosalía
 Raquel del Rosario
 Rosana
Rosendo
 Christina Rosenvinge
 Rozalén
Javier Ruibal
 Russian Red

S

 Joaquín Sabina
 Hugo Salazar
 Salomé
 Paloma San Basilio
 Marta Sánchez
 Eva Santamaría
 Alejandro Sanz
 Pablo de Sarasate
 Jordi Savall
 Ismael Serrano
 Joan Manuel Serrat
 Camilo Sesto
La Shica
 Pastora Soler
David Summers

T
 C. Tangana
 Ana Torroja

U
 Alex Ubago
 Amaya Uranga
 Estíbaliz Uranga
 Izaskun Uranga
 María Uriz (born 1946), operatic soprano

V

 Cristina del Valle
 Raoul Vázquez
Antonio Vega
 José Vélez
 Chirie Vegas
 Ricardo Viñes
 Víctor Manuel
 Rosalía Vila (born 1993), singer

W
 Leonor Watling

Z
 Serafin Zubiri
 Daniel Zueras

Lists of musicians by nationality
 
Musicians
Musicians